Nancy Elizabeth Talbot Clark Binney (May 22, 1825July 28, 1901) was the second woman to earn a medical degree in the United States from a recognized (non-sectarian or allopathic) medical institution after Elizabeth Blackwell, graduating in 1852, and the first woman to earn a medical degree from Case Western Reserve University Medical School, then known as the Cleveland Medical College of the Western Reserve College.

Biography
Nancy was born on May 22, 1825, in Sharon, Massachusetts to Joasiah Talbot and Mary Richards Talbot as the seventh child of five boys and five girls.  In 1845, she married dentist Champion Clark, then bore a daughter who died within a year. Her husband succumbed to typhoid fever dying in March 1848. She found her way to Cleveland, Ohio where under the leadership of Dean Delamater, she became the first female graduate of the Cleveland Medical College in 1852.

Clark returned to Massachusetts, where she practiced medicine in Boston from April 1852 to August 1854 but stopped after she was unsuccessful in gaining admission to the Massachusetts Medical Society due to being a woman. In 1856, she married Amos Binney of Boston and had six children.  After raising the family, she returned to medicine in 1874 opening a free dispensary for women in Boston.

Nancy died in 1901 and was buried at Mount Auburn Cemetery in Cambridge, Massachusetts.

References

External links
 Nancy Talbot Clark and her sisters at Western Reserve in the 1850s: pioneers of medical education of American women

1825 births
1901 deaths
American feminists
Burials at Mount Auburn Cemetery
Case Western Reserve University alumni
Case Western Reserve University School of Medicine alumni
History of women's rights in the United States
People from Sharon, Massachusetts
19th-century American women physicians
19th-century American physicians